Cachascani Airport  is an airstrip in the pampa of Beni Department in Bolivia. The nearest town is Magdalena,  to the northeast.

See also

Transport in Bolivia
List of airports in Bolivia

References

External links 
OpenStreetMap - Cachascani
OurAirports - Cachascani
Bing Maps - Cachascani
HERE/Nokia Maps - Cachascani

Airports in Beni Department